Garrick's Villa is a Grade I listed country house located on Hampton Court Road in  Hampton in the London Borough of Richmond upon Thames. Its park and gardens are listed at Grade II by Historic England in the Register of Historic Parks and Gardens of special historic interest in England.

The house was originally constructed in the Middle Ages. The country house was initially listed as Hampton House prior to its acquisition by the actor and theatre manager David Garrick (1717–1779) in about 1754. Numerous alterations were made to it during Garrick's tenure by  the neoclassical architect Robert Adam (1728–1792), including the portico, the building of an orangery and the construction of a tunnel under the road to connect with his riverside lawn. A wing was added to the west side of the house in 1864.

In the late 19th century, the house belonged first to the preacher John Chippendall Montesquieu Bellew (1823–1874) and then to his son, the actor Kyrle Bellew (1850–1911).

During the early part of the 20th century the house was the family home of Sir (James) Clifton Robinson (1848–1910), Managing Director and Chief Engineer of London United Tramways, and a single private tram track leading into the grounds was constructed. The house was converted into flats in 1922 and redeveloped again in 1969.

On 25 October 2008, during building works on the house, a fire broke out and was brought under control five hours later.

References 

Buildings and structures on the River Thames
David Garrick
Grade I listed buildings in the London Borough of Richmond upon Thames
Grade I listed houses in London
Grade II listed parks and gardens in London
History of Middlesex
History of the London Borough of Richmond upon Thames
Houses completed in 1773
Houses in the London Borough of Richmond upon Thames
Neoclassical architecture in London
Robert Adam buildings
Trams in London